Skånevik is a former municipality in the old Hordaland county, Norway. The   municipality existed from 1838 until its dissolution in 1965. It included the land surrounding both sides of the Skånevikfjorden and its smaller branches: the Åkrafjorden and Matersfjorden in the present-day Etne Municipality and Kvinnherad Municipality. It also included the eastern part of the island of Halsnøya and stretched quite a ways inland all the way to the Folgefonna glacier.  The administrative centre of the municipality was the village of Skånevik where Skånevik Church is located.

History
The parish of Skonevig was established as a municipality on 1 January 1838 (see formannskapsdistrikt law).  The spelling of the name was changed in the early 20th century to its present spelling of Skånevik. On 1 January 1965, the municipality of Skånevik was dissolved due to the recommendations of the Schei Committee during a period of many municipal mergers across Norway.  The area of Skånevik situated south of the Skånevikfjord and Åkrafjorden, as well as the parts of Skånevik located north of the fjord and east of the village of Åkra (population: 1,493) were merged with the neighboring municipality of Etne to the south. The rest of Skånevik lying north of the fjord and west of Åkra (population: 1,189), became a part of the neighbouring municipality of Kvinnherad to the north.

Municipal council
The municipal council  of Skånevik was made up of representatives that were elected to four year terms.  The party breakdown of the final municipal council was as follows:

See also
List of former municipalities of Norway

References

Former municipalities of Norway
Etne
Kvinnherad
1838 establishments in Norway
1965 disestablishments in Norway